Ragada is a 2010 Indian Telugu-language action film directed by Veeru Potla and produced by D. Siva Prasad Reddy. It stars Nagarjuna, Anushka Shetty, Dev Gill and Priyamani in lead roles, with the music composed by S. Thaman. In the film, Satya leaves his village and arrives in Andhra Pradesh to earn money and willingly participates in a fight between two rivals that brings him to their attention.

Ragada was released theatrically on 24 December 2010. In 2011, it was dubbed and released into Tamil as Vambu.

Plot
Devudu attempts to kill an innocent man, who is against Peddanna, but is killed by one of Peddanna's followers Jairam. Peddanna is the famed gangster in all of Andhra Pradesh, and has three major followers who murder people for him. These followers are Jairam, Bhagavan and Nanda. Satya Reddy is a money-minded man, who gets involved in a fight between GK and Peddanna. Satya helps GK, who makes him as his partner, where GK's love interest, Sirisha falls in love with Satya. Satya sees Ashtalakshmi being chased by goons where he saves her. 

Ashtalakshmi and her Brahmin family starts living with Satya for a few days. Satya makes up a plan for GK, to fight Peddanna. In one fight, Jairam captures Sirisha, and Satya saves her by killing Jairam. Ashtalakshmi also loves Satya. Sirisha meets a tattooed friend in the pub which Satya notices. In a restaurant during lunch with Sirisha and Ashtalakshmi, Satya is attacked by Bhagavan's henchmen. Satya goes to Bhagavan's house and kills him and his son, which enrages Peddanna.

Flashback: Satya was an orphan, who is taken care by a loving doctor like Mother Teresa. The people of this city, Kadapa worship her like a goddess. Devendra, a political campaigner, and Peddanna's brother kidnap the doctor's daughter to make sure that she tells everyone to vote for him, but to no avail. Satya arrives and thrashes up Devendra's men, where he learns that he has to acquire  to keep the doctor's hospital running, as Devendra's father had donated the land to the hospital. Peddanna kills the doctor with the help of his goons as Satya has beaten his brother. In order to get the money and seek vengeance against the goons who killed the doctor, Satya had joined GK.

Present: At this time, Satya is back in his house and is dealing with Ashtalakshmi's parents, who are weeping uncontrollably. He finds out that Peddanna's men long ago kidnapped Ashtalakshmi's elder brother. Satya goes to the headquarters where her brother is held and frees him. Then, he finds out that Ashtalakshmi had robbed  from Peddanna with the help of her brother, where she and her brother leave to Bangkok. 

Satya and Sirisha leave for Bangkok, where it is revealed that Ashtalakshmi doesn't have money, Sirisha and Ashtalakshmi are friends, and Ashtalakshmi is the same tattooed girl from the pub. Satya is here to kill Nanda as he knew that Ashtalakshmi's brother will follow Nanda to get his money's share. Satya kills Nanda and returns to India. Peddanna kidnaps Satya's younger sister and tries to kill and bury her. Satya arrives and kills Peddhanna, where he exacts his vengeance and saves the hospital.

Cast

 Nagarjuna Akkineni as Satya Reddy
 Anushka Shetty as Sirisha
 Dev Gill as G. K. 
 Priyamani as Priya / Ashta Lakshmi
 Pradeep Rawat as Peddanna
 Kota Srinivasa Rao as Gangaiah
 Brahmanandam as Veera Brahmam alias Brahmam Darling
 Tanikella Bharani as Devudu 
 Dharmavarapu Subramanyam as Narayana
 Sushant Singh as Nanda
 Supreeth as Bhagawan 
 Raghu Babu as Hotel Server 
 Raghu Karumanchi as Brahmam Darling's henchman
 Vennira Aadai Nirmala as Nirmalamma
 Satya Prakash as Devendra
 Narsing Yadav as Truck Driver
 Bharath Reddy as Kanth , Peddanna's sidekick who betrays Pedanna
 Besant Ravi as Peddanna's henchman
 Master Bharath as Narayana
 Sravan as Jayaram
 Giridhar as Govardhan
 Banerjee
 Jenny
 Prudhvi Raj as gold shop owner 
 Amith
 Ranam Venu 
 Sasidhar 
 Sana
 Srilalitha 
 Rajani
 Charmy Kaur in a special appearance in the song "Meesamunna Manmadhuda"
 Anita Hassanandani Reddy as Banker (cameo)

Soundtrack

The soundtrack was composed by S. Thaman and released by Aditya Music. The audio was launched on 29 November 2010 at the Shilpa Kala Vedika in Hyderabad.

Reception

Ragada received generally mixed reviews from critics.

Andhra Box Office gave the film 3.25 stars out of 5 and called it a treat for Nagarjuna's fans, while praising the action sequences, comedy, songs, punch dialogues and the direction but criticizing Nagarjuna's dance and the predictable storyline.123Telugu similarly gave the film 3.25 stars out of 5 and praised Nagarjuna's performance, Brahmanandam's comedy, the technical aspects and the presence of multiple villains while criticizing the second half and the climax. Idlebrain.com gave it 3 stars out of 5, similarly praising Nagarjuna's performance and Anushka's acting without the makeup along with the twists in the second half, the action sequences and the technical aspects, while criticizing the lack of story in the first half and the presence of multiple villains. Greatandhra also gave it 3 stars out of 5 and praised Nagarjuna's performance, glamour quotient, the opening fight sequence and presentation of songs, but criticized the second half, the placement of songs, jerks in the editing and lack of depth in the characterization of villains.

On the other hand, Rediff.com gave it 2.5 stars out of 5 and praised Nagarjuna's performance and called the film worth the money while also labelling it formulaic. Fullhyd gave it 1.5 stars out of 5, praising Brahmanandam's comedy while criticizing the violence and placement of songs.

Box office

Ragada collected ₹8.48 crores in the opening week. In the second week, the collections amounted to ₹11.54 crores. The total collections in the fourth week amounted to ₹15.27 crores and the total collections including the overseas gross were equal to ₹17.15 crores.

References

External links
 
 

2010 films
2010s Telugu-language films
2010 action films
Indian action films
2010 masala films
Indian films about revenge
Films scored by Thaman S
Films shot in Jordan